45 RPM is a collection of songs by the The. 45 RPM was released in 2002. All the songs were 24-bit digitally remastered to "reveal the full richness and complexity of the original recordings". The album was also released as a limited hardback 2-CD set. The second CD contains eight extended remixes.

Track listing

Disc one
 "Uncertain Smile" (new edit of original version)
 "Perfect" (original version)
 "Sweet Bird of Truth" (new edit)
 "Infected"
 "Heartland" (new edit)
 "Armageddon Days (Are Here Again)"  (new edit)
 "The Beat(en) Generation"
 "Dogs of Lust"
 "Slow Emotion Replay"
 "Love is Stronger than Death"
 "This Is the Day" (Dis-infected version) (a.k.a. "That Was The Day") 
 "I Saw the Light"
 "December Sunlight (Cried Out)" (new version)
 "Pillar Box Red"
 "Deep Down Truth"

Disc two
 "Uncertain Smile (12" remix)"
 "Perfect (12" remix)"
 "Sweet Bird of Truth (12" remix)"
 "Infected (12" remix)"
 "Armageddon Days (DNA Remix)"
 "Violence of Truth (Remix)"
 "Gravitate to Me (12" remix)"
 "Dogs of Lust (Foetus Spermicide Remix)"

References

The The albums
Albums produced by Clive Langer
Albums produced by Alan Winstanley
Albums produced by Roli Mosimann
2002 greatest hits albums
Epic Records compilation albums
Albums produced by Mike Thorne